Salvia palaestina is a herbaceous perennial native to a wide area including what was historically known as Palestine, (which now includes Israel and the Palestinian Territories) and is also native to Turkey, Syria, Iraq, Iran, the Sinai peninsula and northeastern Egypt. It was named and described by George Bentham in 1835, with the specific epithet (palaestina) referring to its geographical distribution "in Palæstinæ montibus inter Gaza et Jerusalem", or the mountains between Gaza and Jerusalem.

S. palaestina grows in a wide variety of habitats, between  elevation. It was introduced into horticulture in the 1990s. The mid-green rugose leaves vary in shape and size, with light hairs on both sides, and glands that release a scent when rubbed or crushed. The  inflorescences grow candelabrum-like at the top of the stems, with 4–6 flowers per whorl. The  flowers are straight and tubular, ranging in color from white to pale lilac.

Notes

Flora of Syria
Plants described in 1835
palaestina
Flora of Iran
Flora of Iraq
Flora of Israel
Flora of Egypt
Flora of Turkey
Flora of Palestine (region)